Chauth Ka Barwara is a town and tehsil headquarters situated in Sawai Madhopur district, Rajasthan. It is also known for Chauth Mata Temple in the region.

References

Villages in Sawai Madhopur district